Greya variabilis is a moth of the family Prodoxidae. It is found on the Yugorski, Taymyr and Chukchi peninsulas of arctic Russia, the Pribilof Islands, Alaska and along the North American west coast. In the northern part of the range, the habitat consists of tundra. In the south, it occurs in moist coniferous forests.

The wingspan is 12–18 mm. The forewings usually have a purplish brown base colour with various patches and streaks of pale ochreous in different patterns.

The larvae possibly feed on Saxifraga species.

References

Moths described in 1992
Prodoxidae
Moths of Japan
Taxa named by Donald R. Davis (entomologist)